Henry Lynch Talbot (2 October 1863 in Greenwich, London, UK – 1911 in Perak, Federated Malay States) was an English cricketer. A right-handed batsman, he played one first-class match for the Marylebone Cricket Club (MCC) in 1895, he also played for the Straits Settlements between 1891 and 1904, and for the Federated Malay States between 1906 and 1908.

References

1863 births
1911 deaths
English cricketers
Straits Settlements cricketers
Federated Malay States cricketers
Marylebone Cricket Club cricketers